New Hope is the name of several communities in the U.S. state of West Virginia.

New Hope, Mercer County, West Virginia
New Hope, Morgan County, West Virginia
New Hope, Nicholas County, West Virginia